Light Up may refer to:

Music
 "Light Up", a single and song by Styx from Equinox
 "Light Up", a song by Tegan and Sara from Sainthood
 "Light Up (The World)", a 2012 song by Yasmin
 "Light Up" (Drake song), a song by Drake featuring Jay-Z
 Light Up (EP), a 2020 extended play by UP10TION

Other uses
 Light Up (puzzle), a binary-determination logic puzzle published by Nikoli
 Light Up (sculpture), a sculpture by Tony Smith
 Lighting up, locking in on a potential target with a fire-control radar

See also 
 Light It Up (disambiguation)